Atlantisella is a genus of glass sponges (Hexactinellids) belonging to the family Euplectellidae, first described in 2002 by Konstantin Tabachnick.

Species of this genus are found off the coast of New Zealand, in the central Pacific and off the west coast of the United States.

References

External links 

GBIF-Atlantisella: images & occurrence data

Hexactinellida genera
Animals described in 2002